Birmingham Bulldogs also known as the Hall Green Bulldogs are a defunct British motorcycle speedway team who operated between 1929 and 1938 and were based at Hall Green Stadium, York Road, Hall Green in Birmingham, England.

History
Under the name Hall Green they entered the inaugural Southern League but withdrew during the 1929 Speedway Southern League and had their record expunged. The following season as the Hall Green Bulldogs they competed in the 1930 Speedway Southern League finishing fifth.

The Bulldogs (now known as the Birmingham Bulldogs) rejoined the league for the 1934 Speedway National League finishing seventh. The club returned to league action during the 1937 Provincial Speedway League finishing 6th and only raced one more year afterwards in the 1938 Speedway National League Division Two.

The club experienced continued problems with residents throughout their existence. The last tie held at Hall Green Stadium was a Northern Cup tie on 19 October 1938.

Notable riders
Billy Dallison
Johnny Lloyd
Fred Strecker

Season summary

References

Defunct British speedway teams